Gol Tappeh (also known as Kul Tepe) is a village in Shamsabad Rural District, in the Central District of Arak County, Markazi Province, Iran. At the 2006 census, its population was 100, in 23 families.

References 

Populated places in Arak County